Sueño de amor (English: Dream of Love) is a Mexican telenovela produced by Juan Osorio for Televisa. It is also broadcast in Univision in the United States.

The main protagonists are Cristián de la Fuente, Betty Monroe, Marjorie de Sousa, Renata Notni and Santiago Ramundo. While Sabine Moussier, Julián Gil, Beatriz Morayra and Jesús Carús are main antagonists. With the stellar performances are Lola Merino, Osvaldo de León, Polo Morín, Julio Mannino and the leading actress Carmen Salinas.

Plot 
Esperanza Guerrero is a single mother working as a teacher at two schools, a state school and an elite school to provide for her two teenagers, Pedro and Patricia. Ricardo Alegría, a married father with two young children, works as an Interpol agent in Los Angeles. Seeking to capture a sleazy jewellery thief known as 'La Sombra', he infiltrates the private school where Esperanza is employed and masquerades as the teacher of the criminal's son. Esperanza and Ricardo are reunited following a 20-year separation and fight to rekindle their love.

Production 
This telenovela is an original story. Production on the telenovela began on December 28, 2015, in Mexico City. The telenovela also films at Televisa San Angel. Producer Juan Osorio traveled to South Korea looking for a good story, but came back to Mexico opting for an original one, with South Korean influences.

Casting 
The casting call for the telenovela was held on November 17, 2015, at Televisa San Ángel. The auditions were later broadcast for fans to stream via Televisa's official website. On November 26, 2015, Renata Notni was confirmed for one of the lead youth roles in the telenovela. On December 3, 2015, actor Daniel Bisogno confirmed, via the "Ventaneando" program, that Betty Monroe would be the lead for the melodrama, and Cristian de la Fuente, was announced as the male lead of the story.

Cast

Main 

 Cristian de la Fuente as Ricardo Alegría
 Betty Monroe as Esperanza Guerrero
 Sabine Moussier as Tracy Kidman
 Julián Gil as Ernesto de la Colina
 Renata Notni as Patricia Guerrero 
 Carmen Salinas as Margarita Manzanares
 Santiago Ramundo as Luca de la Colina 
 Marjorie de Sousa as Cristina Velez
 Isabella Tena as Selena Alegria

Recurring 

Lola Merino as Viviana Conde
 Osvaldo de León as Erasmo Gallo
 Emilio Osorio as Kiko Gallo
Rodrigo Vidal as Félix del Pozo
 Polo Morín as Pedro Carmona Guerrero
Beatriz Morayra as Silvana Fierro
 Julio Mannino as Mario Kuri
Jesús Carús as Vicente Santillana
Kya Shin as Triana Fonseca
Fernanda Urdapilleta as Salma Kuri
Paul Stanley as Adán
Gustavo Munguía as Nacho
TeSan Kang as Choi Pak
María Andrea as Kristel Kuri
Andrés Delgado as Adrián de la Colina
Dayren Chávez as Estrella Gallo
Christian Vega as Virgilio
Isabella Tena as Selena Alegría
María José Mariscal as Pamela
Marilyz León as Sandra
Bea Ranero as Aranza
Ginny Hoffman as Begoña
Laura Vignatti as Anastasia Limantour
Claudia Marían as Bárbara Mayorga
Kelchie Arizmendi as Felicia
Mauricio Ramírez as Rodrigo Alegría
Claudia Martín as Anya

Guest stars 
 El Chapo de Sinaloa as Jerónimo Durán
Juan José Origel as Gonzalo Santillana
Gimena Goméz as Eliza Olivier
David Pasteur as Casildo
Eric Prats as El Amo
 Marco Méndez as Óscar Sousa

Broadcast 
It premiered on Canal de las Estrellas on February 22, 2016, and began airing weeknights on Univision on March 8, 2016, and then was switched to weekday afternoons on July 25, 2016.

Awards and nominations

References

External links 

2016 telenovelas
Mexican telenovelas
Televisa telenovelas
2016 Mexican television series debuts
2016 Mexican television series endings
Spanish-language telenovelas